Wladimir is a masculine given name. It is an alternative spelling of the name Vladimir.

Notable people with the name include:
 Wladimir Brunet de Presle (1809–1875), French historian
 Wladimir de Schoenefeld (1816–1875), German-French botanist
 Wladimir Guedroitz (1873–1941), Russian chamberlain
 Wladimir Aïtoff (1879–1963), French rugby player
 Wladimir Burliuk (1886–1919), Ukrainian artist
 Wladimir d'Ormesson (1888–1973), French essayist and writer
 Wladimir von Pawlowski (1891–1961), Austrian lawyer
 Wladimir Vogel (1896–1984), Russian composer
 Wladimir Seidel (1907–1981), Russian mathematician
 Wladimir A. Smirnoff (1917–2000), Soviet entomologist
 Wladimir Zwalf (1932–2002), British sanskritist and Buddhist expert
 Wladimir Jan Kochanski (1935–2015), American pianist
 Wladimir Wertelecki (born 1936), Polish-American pediatrician
 Wladimir Troubetzkoy (1942–2009), French literary historian
 Wladimir Yordanoff (1954–2020), French actor
 Wladimir (footballer) (b. 1954), Brazilian football left-back
 Wladimir Skulener (born 1958), Soviet-German chess player
 Wladimir Resnitschenko (b. 1965), Russian fencer
 Wladimir Ribeiro (b. 1967), a Brazilian swimmer
 Wladimir Kaminer (b. 1967), Russian writer
 Wladimir Belli (b. 1970), Italian cyclist
 Wladimir Klitschko (b. 1976), Ukrainian professional boxer
 Wladimir Herrera (b. 1981), Chilean football defender
 Wladimir Balentien (b. 1984), Dutch outfielder for the Seattle Mariners
 Wladimir Tchertkoff (fl. 2003–present), Italian journalist
 Wladimir Köppen, creator of the Köppen climate classification
 Wladimir Talanczuk, Ukrainian aeronautical engineer
 Wladimir van Wilgenburg, Dutch journalist

See also 
 
 Vladimir (name)
 Wladimiro

Masculine given names